Burton Dassett Hills Country Park is a country park in southeastern Warwickshire, England.

It was created as a country park in 1971 and is run by Warwickshire County Council. The area comprises a group of ironstone hills, which are named after the village of Burton Dassett which is located in the hills. The hills rise to 211 m (692 ft) above sea level and are situated half a mile east of the M40 motorway.

The area was once extensively quarried for ironstone and a short industrial railway – Edge Hill Light Railway – existed for this purpose until the 1920s.

Of interest at the site is a 12th-century parish church at the old village of Burton Dassett. Outside the church is a holy well which still provides water. The park is also popular with flyers of kites and radio-controlled gliders.

Impressive views across the surrounding countryside can be seen from the hills; towns and other features that are viewable are described by a toposcope. On a clear day, places as far afield as Coventry (more than 20 miles away) can be seen. The park and the church were used as a location in the Tom Selleck 1990 film Three Men and a Little Lady.

References

External links

Warwickshire County Council site on Burton Dassett Hills Country Park
Guide from BBC Coventry
Photos of Burton Dassett Hills and surrounding area on geograph
Geology of the Burton Dassetts Hills, Warwickshire's Jurassic Park, from Warwickshire Geological Conservation Group (WGCG)

Hills of Warwickshire
Country parks in Warwickshire
Holy wells in England
Mountains and hills of the United Kingdom with toposcopes
Stratford-on-Avon District
1975 establishments in England